The women's 400 metres at the 2019 Asian Athletics Championships was held on 21 April.

Medalists

Results

Heats
Qualification rule: First 3 in each heat (Q) and the next 2 fastest (q) qualified for the final.

Final

References
Results

400
400 metres at the Asian Athletics Championships
2019 in women's athletics